Pashto is an S-O-V language with split ergativity. Adjectives come before nouns. Nouns and adjectives are inflected for gender (masc./fem.), number (sing./plur.), and case (direct, oblique, ablative and vocative). The verb system is very intricate with the following tenses: Present; simple past; past progressive; present perfect; and past perfect. In any of the past tenses (simple past, past progressive, present perfect, past perfect), Pashto is an ergative language; i.e., transitive verbs in any of the past tenses agree with the object of the sentence. The dialects show some non-standard grammatical features, some of which are archaisms or descendants of old forms.

In the following article stress is represented by the following markers over vowels: ә́, á, ā́, ú, ó, í and é.

Pronouns

 Note: هغه as a demonstrative pronoun (that) has initial stress [háğa] whereas the personal pronoun (he, she, it) has final stress [hağá].

Personal pronouns

Demonstrative pronouns

Possessive pronouns
There is no plural form with nouns.

Interrogative pronouns

Indefinite 

 In order to distinguish sentences with indefinites from questions, یو /yaw/ 'one' may be added, to yield یو څوک /yaw ʦok/ 'someone' and یو څه /yaw ʦə/ 'something'.
 When هر /har, ar/ 'every' precedes the indefinite pronouns, the combination can mean everyone [هر څوک], everything [هر څه], each one [هر یو]

Nouns

Case and gender
Pashto inflects nouns into four grammatical cases: direct, oblique, ablative (also known as oblique II) and vocative. The oblique case is used as prepositional case as well as in the past tense as the subject of transitive verbs (i.e. in ergative construction), and the ablative case is used with certain prepositions and with some numerals.

There are two genders: masculine and feminine. Gender of a noun is indicated by its ending. Animate nouns' gender agrees with biological gender regardless of the ending.

Pashto has no definite article. But when necessary, definiteness may be indicated by other means such as demonstratives. Likewise, it may be contraindicated by use of the word for "one", يو; as in "يو روغتون" – "a hospital".

Class 1

Masculine nouns
Generally, animate masculine nouns take ان -ā́n in plural, and inanimate ones take ونه -úna. Masculine nouns ending in ۀ -ә lose it when attaching the suffixes. The grammatical animacy usually corresponds with physical animacy, but there are some exceptions, like مېړۀ meṛә́ "husband" is inanimate grammatically with plural مېړونه meṛúna, and پل pul "bridge" is animate — پلان pulā́n.

The nouns ending in -i, -ā (these are always animate) or -u (these can be both animate and inanimate) take ان with -g-, -y- or -w- inserted between vowels.

Words ending in -āCә́ pattern (like وادۀ wādә́ "wedding") have short -a- in plural.

Examples

Feminine nouns 
Feminine nouns generally have final -a. They change it to -e in the oblique cases and direct plural and to -o in oblique plural, independently of their animacy. A few feminine nouns end in a consonant, they still take the same endings.

In Southern Pashto, the final -e is pronounced -i when unstressed. For example, the plural of سترګه stә́rga "eye" and لار lār "way" would be سترګې stә́rge and لارې lā́re in the North, but سترګي stә́rgi and لاري lā́ri in the South, while مڼه maṇá "apple" and تخته taxtá "board" would be مڼې maṇé and تختې taxté in both dialect groups.

There are also feminine nouns ending in other vowels, particularly -e (they take یانې -yā́ne in the plural) and -ā or -o (they take either ګانې -gā́ne or وې -we). In Southern Pashto they are یاني -yā́ni, ګاني -gā́ni and وي -wi (the last one is not as common as in Northern Pashto and is mostly restricted to a few nouns).

Examples

Class 2 
In class 2 there's only masculine nouns, both animate and inanimate. They are subject to various alterations inside the stems. The take -ə́ in the plural and oblique forms.

Nouns with -ú- or -ó- in the last syllable change them to -ā-. Some nouns like تنور tanúr "oven" belong to the mixed conjugation, they form their oblique forms as Class 2 nouns, but their plurals are derived according to Class 1 pattern (but the -ú/ó- may be reduced to -a- in Southern dialects or -ə- in Northern dialects). The word پالېز paléz "kitchen garden" is often cited as an example of a noun that belongs to class 2, but doesn't undergo any stem changes.

There are some animate masculine nouns ending in -á (مېلمه melma "guest", اسبه asba "(horse) shepherd", غوبه ğoba "(cow) shepherd", کوربه korba "owner of the house" etc.), they also belong to Class 2.

Monosyllabic nouns with -a- lose it and take -ə in the oblique and plural forms. There several exceptions here: غر ğar "mountain", ور war "door", ګز gaz "gaz (unit of length)", من man "man (unit of weight)", ټغر ṭağar "rug" take ونه -úna in the plural form (غرونه ğrúna, ورونه warúna/wrúna etc).

Nouns with -á- in the last syllable change it to -ə́-. Most of them are mixed in their conjugation: they can take (or not take) -ā́n or -úna in the plural form. A lot of inanimate nouns in this class can take both suffixes. The only exception here is سخر sxar "stone", which is always sxə́r in plural. This subclass also contains words suffixed with ګر, ور, ن, زن.

 

Examples

Class 3 
Nouns in Class 3 are related to adjectives ending in -ay, -əy, -e.

Masculine -áy (note the stress) nouns, especially if animate, sometimes have alternative plurals in -yā́n. Its usage is somewhat dialect-dependent, they aren't as common in Southern Pashto.

Among feminine -əy nouns, even inanimate ones can take یانې or ګانې, they also can stay unchanged in the plural. Some abstract nouns suffixed with ي -i (such as دوستي "friendship", چلاکي "trickiness", ګرمي "heatness" etc.) also belong here.

Examples

Uncountable nouns 
They don't have plural forms. They take و -o in the oblique and ablative forms.

Feminine
Examples include اوړه [oṛә́ – flour], اوبه [obә́ -water], پۍ [pə́i – milk] etc.

Example: اوبه – water

Example: پۍ – milk

Masculine
Examples include: ږدن [ẓ̌dәn -sorghum], دال [dāl -lentils], شراب [šarā́b – alcohol]

Example: دال – lentils

Irregular nouns 
These are limited to nouns denoting kinship.

Feminine – "or" stem
These include:

مور /mor/ 'mother'; plural stem /máynd-/

خور /xor/ 'sister'; plural stem /xwáynd-/

ترور /tror/ 'paternal aunt'; plural stem /tráynd-/

نګور /ngor/ 'daughter-in-law'; plural stem /ngáynd-/

Example:

Brother and daughter
ورور= brother takes وڼه in direct plural

لور= daughter takes وڼې in direct plural

Son

Adjectives
An adjective is called stāynúm in Pashto [ستاينوم]. The adjectives or stāynumúna agree with the nouns they modify in gender, number, and case.

Notes:
In the plural, both obliques and the vocative merge into a single form.
Singular Oblique I and plural Direct always merge into a single form.
The above two conditions mean that there can be at most five distinct forms for masculine adjectives (but in fact, no class distinguishes more than four).
For feminine adjectives, singular Oblique I and Vocative merge, while singular Direct and Oblique II merge; combined with mergers noted previously, there can be at most three distinct forms for feminine adjectives.
Categories 2 and 3 have stem and stress alternations among different cases. Category 3 has a basic distinction between the masculine singular Direct, Oblique II and Vocative, with stem stress, and all other forms, with a (sometimes) different stem and with ending stress (e.g. masc. trīx, fem. traxá "bitter"; masc. sūr, fem. srá "red"; masc. sōṛ, fem. saṛá "cold"; fem. raṇā "light" with only one stem). Category 2 has the same stress alternation, but has three distinct stems, with stressed stem vowel 'o' or 'u' in masculine singular Direct, Oblique II and Vocative, unstressed stem vowel 'ā' in masculine singular Oblique I and plural Direct, and unstressed stem vowel 'a' in all other forms (e.g. masc. sing. pōx, masc. plur. pāxǝ́, fem. paxá "ripe, cooked").

Class 1

Case-marking suffixes
Class I adjectives are consonant-final in their citation form and keep the stress on the final syllable of the stem.

Stem allomorphy
In the Southern dialects, Class I adjectives with certain stem shapes will undergo mutation either:
 Vowel harmony
or
 Centralization
In other dialects these vowels do not mutate.

Vowel harmony
Class I adjectives with the stressed stem vowel /ə́/ (Southern), such as دنګ /dəng/ 'tall', undergo regressive harmony in the feminine direct plural and in both oblique plural forms—when the suffix vowel is /o/.

Centralization
Class I adjectives for which the last syllable in the masculine direct singular form is ور /‑wár/, ګر /‑gár/, جن /‑ján/, or م ن /‑mán/, as well as ordinal numbers ending in م /‑ám/, undergo a different vowel alternation: the vowel /á/ of the final syllable centralizes to /ə́/ in feminine non-direct singulars and in all plural forms, irrespective of gender.

Class I forms with stem allomorphy
Example 1 = سپک (light – in weight) 

The paradigm for the adjective سپک /spək/ 'light' in above shows the Southern dialect's Vowel harmony rule.

Example 2 = زړور (brave) 

The paradigm for the adjective زړور /zṛawár/ 'brave' illustrates centralization rule for the Southern dialect.

Animacy 
When modifying animate nouns, some Class I adjectives may take the animate plural suffixes of Class I nouns example:

Class 2
Class 2 adjectives can end in either a consonant or a stressed schwa ( ه /‑ə́/). Except for the masculine singular ablative and vocative suffixes, the suffixes of Class II are
inherently stressed. These stressed suffixes are the chief difference between Class 1 and Class 2, although there are a few differences in suffix shape as well. Whether a consonant-final adjective belongs to Class 1 (stem-stressed) or Class II (suffix-stressed) is a property of the lexeme and is not predictable.

Case-marking suffixes

Stem allomorphy
Some Class2 adjectives undergo stem allomorphy processes upon inflection, all of them stress-conditioned. The first, Syncope I, affects the final vowels of /ə́/-final Class 2 adjectives; the rest affect the stem vowels of consonant-final Class 2 adjectives (which either lower or delete when unstressed). Lowering affects only back vowels, but not all of them. It is not possible to predict which rule, Back vowel lowering or Syncope II, applies to a given consonant-final adjective. The rules are:
 Syncope I
 Back vowel lowering
 Monophthongization
 Lengthening
 Syncope II
 Epenthesis

Syncope I
 V2 → Ø/ V́1_
 V́1 → Ø/ _V́2
If suffixation results in two adjacent vowels and only one is stressed, the unstressed vowel deletes. If both are stressed, the first vowel deletes. This rule applies to vowel-final adjectives.

Examole: Vowel-final adjectives that end in stressed ۀ /‑ə́/

Vowel-final adjectives that end stressed ه /‑ə́/ in their citation form include تېره /terə/́ 'sharp'. These can be reliably identified from this citation form as belonging to Class 2; no other class has adjectives ending in /-ə́/. The final stem-vowel of these adjectives undergoes one or other of the morphophonemic rules of Syncope I.

Back vowel lowering
 V-stress] [+back, → V[-high]/ C_
Inmost Class 2 consonant-final adjectives with non-initial back vowels, و /o/, /u/ lowers to /a/ when unstressed.

In most consonant-final adjectives where the stem vowel is a back vowel, و /o/, /u/, it will undergo vowel lowering in unstressed position, followed by lengthening when the next syllable contains /ə́/ such as for the words, پو خ /pox/ 'cooked, ripe' and ړوند /ṛund/ 'blind', illustrated above.

Monophthongization
 a[+stress]w → V-high] [+back,
 wa[+stress] → V-high] [+back,
In adjectives with /aw/ or /wa/ in the stem [usually seen in the feminine tense], those sequences simplify to /o/ when stressed.

Back vowel breaking: تود /tod/ 'hot'; stem = /tawd/.

Lengthening
 a → ā /_(C)Cə́

Short /a/ lengthens to long /ā/ when the syllable following it contains /ə́/. This rule affects those adjectives that undergo back vowel lowering, such as for پاخۀ → پوخ and ړاندۀ → ړوند and those that undergo monophthongization, such as تاودۀ → تود.

Lengthening
 V[-stress] → Ø

In a few consonant-final adjectives the stem vowel is deleted when not stressed.

Example = سور /sur/ – red

Epenthesis
 Ø → a/C_CC or CC_C

If syncope results in a triple consonant cluster, an /a/ might be inserted after the first or second consonant.

Class 3
These adjectives end in the diphthong participial suffix, ی /‑ay/, in the masculine direct singular form/. This suffix may be stressed or unstressed.

Case-marking suffixes 
Stressed

Unstressed

Stressed
Example = زلمی (young/youth – the ی is stressed)

Unstressed
Example = سوی (burnt- the ی is unstressed)

Class 4 
This the "non-declining" class – these do not decline. These adjectives are generally borrowed from other languages. They do not have masculine-feminine or singular-plural distinction.

But some speakers use the oblique suffixes  و /‑o/, وو /‑wo/ on these adjectives in the plural oblique, ablative and vocative cases.

Example = شمالي (Persian-Arabic borrowing) 

Example = شمالي (Southern Dialect)

Derivational affixes
Pashto utilities morphological derivation: there is an addition to the base form or stem of a word in order to modify its meaning [not grammatical function like verbal suffixes].

Prefixes
These are attached at the beginning of words. Here is a list of the most common ones:

A list of examples:
{| class="wikitable"
! !! Word !! English meaning !! Prefixed word !! English meaning
|-
| نا  nā || وړ
waṛ
| suitable || ناوړ
nāwáṛ
| unsuitable
|-
| بې  be || کور
kor
| home|| بې کوره
be kóra

[کور in the ablative case]
| homeless
|-
| بيا  byā ||جوړول
joṛawә́l
| to make || بيا جوړول
byā joṛawә́l
| to remake
|-
| هم ham ||[زولی [نارينه]، زولې [ښځينه
zólay, zóle
| age [classical Pashto] || همزولی، همزولې
hamzólay, hamzól
| coeval
|-
| ګڼ gaṇ||هېواديز
hewādíz
| national || ګڼ هېواديز
gaṇhewādíz
| multinational
|-
| دوه dwa|| اړخيز
aṛxíz
| aṛx= side, íz = adjective forming suffix || دوه اړخيز
dwa aṛxíz
| bilateral
|}

 Suffixes 
These are attached at the end of a word. Here is a list of the most common ones:

A list of examples:
{| class="wikitable"
! !! Word !! English meaning !! Prefixed word !! English meaning|-
| توب tob || بربنډ
barbə́nḍ
| nude || بربنډتوب
barbənḍtób
| nudeness/nudity
|-
| تیا tyā || روغ
roğ
| healthy ||روغتيا
roğtyā́
| health
|-
| ي  i|| ولس
(w)ulə́s
| nation || ولسي
(w) uləsí
| national
|-
| ي i|| ترکاڼ
tarkā́ṇ
| carpenter || ترکاڼي
tarkāṇí
| carpentry 
|-
| يز/يزه  iz/iza||لمر
lmar
| sun || لمريز
lmaríz لمريزه

lmaríza
| solar
|-
| يز/يزه  yiz/yiza||وټه
wáṭa
| economy || وټه ييز
waṭayízوټه ييزه

waṭayíza
| economic
|-
| من man ||لانجه
lānjá
| problem || لانجمن
lānjamán

lānjamə́n
| problematic
|-
|جنjən|کرکه
krә́ka
|repugnance 
|کرکجن
krәjә́n
|someone who is repugnant 
to something
|-
|ينin|زر
zar
|gold
|زرين
zarín
|golden
|-
|ور war||ګټه
gáṭa
| profit || ګټور
gaṭawár
| advantageous
|-
|مam/əm|اووه
uwə́
|seven
|اووم
uwə́m
|seventh
|-
| ښت əx̌t||جوړ
joṛ
| made/built || جوړښت
joṛə́x̌t
| structure
|-
| ګلوي galwi||پلار
plār
| father ||پلارګلوي
plār
| paternity
|-
| والی wālay||اوږد
uẓ̌d
| long ||اوږدوالی
uẓ̌dwā́lay
| length/height
|-
| ولي wali||ورور
wror
| brother ||ورورولي
wrorwalí
| brotherhood
|-
| ځی dzay||ښوول
x̌owə́l
| to teach || ښونځی
x̌owə́ndzay
| school
|-
| نهəna||غوښتل
ğox̌tə́l
| to demand ||غوښتنه
ğox̌tə́na
| demand
|-
| ون un||بدلول
badlawə́l
| to change ||بدلون
badlún 
| change
|-
| اک  āk||څښل
tsx̌ə́lخوړل

xwaṛə́l
| to drinkto eat ||څښاک
tsx̌ākخوراک

xwaṛā́k
|drinkfood
|-
| تون tun||پوهنه
pohə́na
| knowledge||پوهنتون
pohəntún
|university 
|-
| پال/پاله  pal/pāla||مېلمه
melmá
| guest ||مېلمه پال
melmapā́lمېلمه پاله

melmapā́la
|host
|-
| پالنه pālana||مېلمه
melmá
|guest||مېلمه پالنه
melmapālə́na
|hospitality
|-
| واکي wāki||پلار
plār
| father||پلارواکي
plārwākí
|patriarchy 
|-
| وال wāl'''||ليک
lik
| writing||ليکوال
likwā́l
|writer
|-
|واله
wālə
|غنم
ğanə́m
|wheat
|غنم واله
ğanəmwālə
|wheat-merchant
|-
| ګر gər||کوډه
kóḍa
| magic ||کوډګر
koḍgə́r

koḍgár
|magician
|-
| چي chi||توپ
top
| cannon||توپچي
topčí
|cannoneer
|-
| ګوټی goṭay||کتاب
kitā́b
| book||کتاب ګوټی
kitābgóṭay
|booklet
|-
| وزمه wazma||تور
tor
| black ||تور وزمه
torwázma
|blackish
|-
|نی
(a)náy
|کال
kāl
|year
|کالنی
kālanáy
|annual
|-
|ی
áy
|جاپان
jāpā́n
|Japan
|جاپانی
jāpānáy
|a Japanese male
|-
|ۍ
ə́i
|جاپان
jāpā́n
|Japan
|جاپانۍ
jāpānə́i
|a Japanese female
|-
| ګنۍ ganai||پلار
plārمور

mor
| fathermother ||پلارګنۍ
plārganə́iمورګنۍ

morganə́i
|paternal-familymaternal-family
|-
| وړ/وړه  waṛ/waṛa||خندا
xandā́
| laughter||خنداوړ
xandāwáṛخنداوړه

xandāwáṛa
|laughable 
|-
| يالۍ /يالی  yālay/yālə́i||ننګ
nang
| honor||ننګيالی
nangyāláyننګيالۍ

nangyālə́i
|honorable
|-
| غاړې /غاړی  ğāṛay/ğāṛe||سندره
sandə́ra
| song||سندرغاړی
sandərğā́ṛayسندرغاړې

sandərğā́ṛe
|singer
|-
| چک cak||سپين
spin
| white ||سپين چک
spinčák
|whitish 
|-
| ډلهḍala||لوب
lob
| root word of play ||لوبډله
lobḍála
|team (sports)
|-
|هارhār||پړک
pṛak
|slap/clap|| پړکهار
pṛakahā́r
|clapping/sounds of claps
|}

 Creating new words 

Other than the recognised words above; new words can be coined by speakers through these affixes

Example:

 Infinitive 
This is called Kaṛnúmay [کړنومی] in Pashto that is "the name of a verb". It shows an infinite action or occurrence. It is used as a noun. It acquires the gender and number of a masculine plural noun.

Example: وکړل [past perfective tense of the transitive verb کول – "to do"] shows agreement with masculine plural object that is the infinitive وهل.

 Double infinitives 
These are formed by combining two infinitives
– either by combining a simple infinitive with a prefixed infinitive.

– or by combining two simple infinitives:

 Verb 
Pashto has three tenses: Past, present and future. 
The future tense is the same as present tense with the exception of markers.
Aspect: Pashto in every tense has perfective aspect [بشپړاړخ] and imperfective aspect [نابشپړاړخ]. The perfective aspect indicates completion of an action while the imperfective aspect indicates continuous or habitual action.
Pashto verbs are of four categories: simple verbs, prefixed verbs, a-initial verbs and compound verbs. 
Prefixed verbs, a-initial verbs and compound verbs are separable. 
Pashto verbs can be conjugated by the bases they have.
Present and imperative forms are formed on present bases. Past, optative, and infinitive forms are formed on past bases.
Based on the stems they classed as either single stemmed, two stemmed or multiple stemmed
Verbs agree in person and in number with either the objects or subjects of sentences, depending on tense and construction. 
Agreement is indicated with verbal suffixes following the verb stem which indicate person and number.

 Verbs: categories 

 Simple verbs 
They are in the morpheme state.

Examples:

 Prefixed verbs 
These are described below as doubly irregular.

They take the form of a derivational prefix plus a verb base.

 Deictic prefixed verb 
These correspond to the oblique pronominal and directionals clitics.

 Non-productive prefixed verbs 
Like deictic prefixed these are subject to the same rules of stress movement to show perfective aspect, as well as to separation from the rest of the verb by negative morphemes and second-position clitics. But generally their meanings are not synchronically separable from the verbal lexeme of which they are a part of.

Example: پرېکول – to cut. The prefix [پرې] is separated from the verb stem [کول] by a second position clitic [يې]

 a-initial verbs 
These begin with ا /a/; but they do not include compound verbs beginning with /a/.

Examples:

Their syntactic behaviour resembles that of prefixed verbs: the initial /a/ can separate from the rest of the verb as though it were a prefix. Unlike prefixed verbs, a-initial verbs differ in that

they take the prefix و  /wə́/ for perfective forms.

Unlike all the verbs; they are unusual, in that their stress is variable in the imperfective aspect: it can be either be initial or non-initial. Other verbs can not have initial stress. When the /a/ is separated from the rest of the verb in the imperfective aspect it has initial stress.

Example: initial stress

Example: non-initial stress

Compound verbs
There are two categories of compound verbs. There are also some exceptions to these.

First category
These are formed by adding ول [-wә́l] and ېدل [edә́l] verbal-suffixes to nouns, adjectives or adverbs. The attaching noun, adjective and adverb should not end in a vowel.

Example:

 Exceptions 
There are also exceptions to this category. Example: سوچ کول etc.

Second category
These are formed adding auxiliary verbs کول and کېدل to the noun and adjectives. The attaching noun and adjective end in a vowel.

Examples:
 

 Verbs: conjugation classes 
These can be divided in reference to the verb categories as above:

 First Conjugation Class: Simple Verbs and A-Initial Verbs
 Second Conjugation Class: Prefixed Verbs
 Third Conjugation Class: Compound Verbs

 Verbs:  bases 
Pashto verb bases are formed according to the tense (present/past) and aspect (perfective/imperfective) of a verb.

Aspect

The perfective aspect is indicated by the stressed prefix و /wә́/ or in the case of complex verbs [prefixed verbs, a-initial and compound verbs] by stress on the prefix or complement. The imperfective aspect  is indicated by the absence of و /wə/ or stress on the verb itself rather than the prefix or complement.

Tense

The present tense either by the absence of this suffix (transitives), or by the suffix ېږ  /ég/ (intransitives).

For single stem verbs: the past tenses is indicated by either the suffix ل /ə́l/ (for transitive verbs) or ېد /ed(ə́l)/ (for intransitives).

For two or more stemmed verbs:  the past tense is indicated by stem allomorphy.

Bases

Therefore, the following four-fold-method to differentianate of bases:

1. present perfective

2. present imperfective

3. past perfective

4. past impefective

Inflection

In order to make fully inflected verbs, you add either of the following to these bases:

 a verbal suffix
 an imperative or optative suffix, or
 an adjectival suffix (to form a participle)

Verbs:  Single Stems
These are referred to as Weak Verbs by Anna Boyle.
These have one stem. From this single stem from all four bases are predictable.

 First Conjugation Class 
 Transitve 
Here is  an example first conjugation class transitive verb: "to tie"

Notes:

 present imperfective base = stem
 present perfective base: و  /wә́/ + stem
 past imperfective base: stem+ ل /ə́l/ (suffix obligatory)
 past perfective base: و  /wә́/ + stem+ ل /əl/(suffix obligatory)

 Intransitve 
Here is  an example first conjugation class intransitive verb: "to reach"

Notes:

 present imperfective base: stem+ ېږ /eg/
 present perfective base: و  /wә́/ + stem+ ېږ /eg/
 past imperfective base: stem + ېد /ed/ (+ ل /ə́l/—prohibited in 3rd Person Sing. Masc; optional elsewhere)
 past perfective base:  و  /wә́/ + stem + ېد /ed/( + ل /əl/— prohibited in 3rd Person Sing. Masc; optional elsewhere)

 Second Conjugation Class 
In the second conjugation, perfectives are formed by a shift of stress to the existing prefix, rather than the addition of the و  /wә́/ prefix.

Here is  an example first conjugation class transitive verb: "to bring (to speaker)"

Notes:

 present imperfective base = stem
 present perfective base: stressed prefix + stem
 past imperfective base: prefix + stem+ ل /ə́l/(suffix obligatory)
 past perfective base: stressed prefix + stem+ ل /ə́l/(suffix obligatory)

Verbs:  Two  Stems
These are referred to as Strong Verbs by Anna Boyle

These have two stems:  present stem and a past stem.

 First Conjugation Class 
The stems can either share initial sounds as in example:

Or they can be  share no similar sounds

Example: the verb لیدل [to see]

In either case the same rules apply, as noted by Anna Boyle:

Notes:
 present imperfective base = present stem
 present perfective base: و  /wә́/ + present stem
 past imperfective base: past stem (+ ل /ə́l/—prohibited in 3rd Person Sing. Masc; optional elsewhere)
 past perfective base: و  /wә́/ + past stem(+ ل /ə́l/—prohibited in 3rd Person Sing. Masc; optional elsewhere)

 Second Conjugation Class 
As above, in  the second conjugation, perfectives are formed by a shift of stress to the existing prefix, rather than the addition of the و  /wә́/ prefix. 
	
Example one: the verb پرېښودل  [to leave]

Notes:
 present imperfective base = present stem
 present perfective base: stressed prefix + present stem
 past imperfective base: prefix + past stem (+ ل /ə́l/—prohibited in 3rd Person Sing. Masc.; optional elsewhere)
 past perfective base: stressed prefix + past stem(+ ل /ə́l/—prohibited in 3rd Person Sing. Masc; optional elsewhere)

Verbs: Multiple Stems

These are referred to as Strong Verbs by Anna Boyle.

These are verbs whose imperfective and perfective stems differ as well as their present and past stems. The difference between perfective and imperfective is carried by stress; in perfective the stress is on the first part of the verb whereas in imperfective the stress is on the last syllables.

These examples have been taken from Anna Boyle, pages 219–224 with the tables rearranged:

Examples:

Observation:  either three stemmed [ږد, کېږد, کېښود] or four stemmed [یښود ږد, کېږد, کېښود] 

Observation: Four stems 
 		

 
Observation: Four Stems

Observation: This example contains locative prefixes را,در,ور  
 		

Observation:Three stems:وړ [wṛ] for imperfective and یوس + یووړ for the perfectives . Note – Prefixed وړل /wṛә́l/ 'to carry', use its weak stem [as illustrated with پرېوتل above]
 		

 
Notes:

• Present imperfective base = (present) imperfective stem	

• Present perfective base: initial-stressed present perfective stem	

• Past imperfective base: (past continuous) stem+ (ل /ə́l/—prohibited in 3rd Person Sing. Masc; optional elsewhere)

• Past perfective base: initial-stressed past perfective stem + (ل /ə́l/—prohibited in 3rd Person Sing. Masc; optional elsewhere)

 کول and کېدل 
Here there use as main verbs are eluded to.
To the verb – to do: The brackete [ṛ] in the present perfective base of کول /kawә́l/ 'to do' indicates that it sometimes is not pronounced in speech

Important: Here there use as main verbs are eluded to - when کول and کېدل are used as verbalizers, their perfective forms are not formed with the first conjugation prefix و  /wә́/, but are irregular.

 	
To the verb – to become	
 		

 
Notes:

• Present imperfective base = (present) imperfective stem

• Present perfective base:  و  /wә́/ + present perfective stem

• Past imperfective base: (past continuous) stem+ ( ل /ə́l/—prohibited in  3rd Person Sing. Masc; optional elsewhere)

• Past perfective base: و  /wә́/ + past perfective stem + ( ل  /‑ə́l-/—prohibited in  3rd Person Sing. Masc; optional elsewhere)

 Verbs: aspect 
Pashto in every tense has an aspect: perfective aspect [بشپړاړخ] and imperfective aspect [نابشپړاړخ]. The perfective aspect indicates completion or termination of an action. The imperfective aspect indicates continuity of an action or the habitual nature of the action.

 Stress 

In both aspects the stress [خج] is applied to the verb. In perfective, the stress is applied to the initial part of the verb, while in the imperfective it is generally applied to the final part of the verb.

 First conjugation 
First conjugation verbs, e.g. وهل as above, can be recognised by perfective form, which begin with the prefix و /wə́/, which carries an inherent stress. In a-initial verbs, the perfecive prefix و  /wə́/ coalesces with the /a/ to form a prefix وا /wā́/.

Example:

 Second conjugation 
These are referred to as prefixed verbs aboves: all of the form prefix + stem. These behave morphosyntactically: they undergo stress shift to form the perfectived, and they can be separated from the stem by a second-position clitic or the negative morpheme.

Example:
 	

 Third conjugation 
These are called compound verbs above – those with adjective complements and noun complements + forms of کول /kawə́l/ or کېدل /kedə́l/. Here the perfective is formed by:
 
 shifting stress from the verbalizer to the noun or adjective complement, according to the lexical stress of noun or adjective	
 using the irregular perfective forms of the verbalizer (rather than the forms with و  /wə́/).
	
Many third conjugation verbs are contracted in the imperfective aspect, in perfective constructions, the complement is always separate from the verbalizer.
 
Example 1:

 	
Example 2:

Verbs: verbal suffixes
Pashto utilises verbal suffixes [د کړ تاړي].

Personal suffixes 
Verbal suffixes in Pashto denote person, gender and number. 

It is easy to demonstrate these in with intransitive verbs in the imperfective.

Present imperfective tense
Gəḍéẓ̌ is the present imperfective stem of the verb gaḍedəl [to dance]. 

Past imperfective tense
Gəḍēd is the past stem of the verb gaḍēdəl [to dance].

Note: In the plural the 3rd person past masculine can denote both genders when talking about a group. While in the plural the 3rd person past feminine is only used when talking about a group of individuals classed in the female gender.Example: هغوی ګډېدل [They were dancing] – can imply only males dancing or both males and females dancing
 هغوی ګډېدې [They were dancing] – implies only women were dancing. It can also be used for transgenders [ايجړاګان] by itself. But you can not say ايجړاګان ګډېدې since ايجړا is a masculine noun so one would use ايجړاګان ګډېدل.

 3rd Person Past Singular Masculine 
Generally ه [ə] or  no-stem suffix is employed. But sometimes  ئ [əi] is found also.

 Plural suffix of وتل watəl 
With وتل the plural suffix ل(əl) is not used instead:

 Verbs: agreement 
 Intransitive verbs 
As can be seen from the intransitive verb above [ګډېدل] – the verb agrees with the subject.

 Agreement – transitive verbs 

 Ergative construction is used in the past tense of transitive verbs: the predicate [verb] agrees in person, number and gender with the object. The subject changes to into the oblique case.
 In the present tense the transitive verb agrees with the subject: in person, number and gender.

Example 1: خوړل – transitive verb – to eat

Compare: 

Example 2: اغوستل – transitive verb – to put on/dress

Compare:

 Compound transitive verbs – split agreement 
In the present tense the nominal/adjectival part of the compound verb agrees with the object. But the auxiliary کول [to do] agrees with the subject.

Example: پاکول – compound transitive verb – to clean

In the past both nominal/adjectival and auxiliary components agree with the object.

Example: پاکول – compound transitive verb – to clean

 Verbs: participle 

 Present participle 
The present participle is formed with the past imperfective stem without ل (əl) + ونک (unk) and declension follows the pattern of unstressed ی (ay).

Example ليکل [likəˈl] – writer → ليک [lik] past imperfective stem → ليکونکی [likəwúnkay] – writer

 Past participle 

 Past participle suffix 
The past participle employs the following stems. It is used in perfect constructions of the verb.

 Present perfect 
This is formed in the following ways:

Category 1 [non-compound verbs]: Past imperfective stem + past participle suffix + present imperfective of "to be"

Category 2 [compound verbs]: Past perfective stem of کېدل-ېدل and کول-ول + past participle suffix + present imperfective of "to be"

Example: of Category 1 verb رسېدل

 Future perfect 
Formed by به [future marker] +present perfect

 Past perfect 
This is formed in the following ways:

Category 1 [non-compound verbs]: Past imperfective stem + past participle suffix + past imperfective of "to be"

Category 2 [compound verbs]: Past perfective stem of کېدل-ېدل and کول-ول + past participle suffix + past imperfective of "to be"

Example:

 Agreement 
 Transitive verbs uses ergative construction: Past participle + verb "to be" agree with object; subject is in oblique case
 Intransitive verbs: Past participle+ verb "to be" agree with the subject

Example: Intransitive Category 2 verb پخېدل [to ripen, mature]

 Verbs: potential construction 

 Optative 
The imperfective optative = past imperfective base of verb+ ای-āy [Southern Dialects], ی-ay [North Western Dialects], ې [North Eastern Dialects]

The perfective optative = past perfective base of verb+ ای-āy [Southern Dialects], ی-ay [North Western Dialects], ې [North Eastern Dialects]

 Present potential 
Formed by:

Imperfective optative + present perfective of کېدل

Example:

 Past potential 

 Past potential 1 
To indicate:

 Event did not take place: مونږ تېر کال جوار کرلی شوه [We might have been able to plant corn last year]
 Event carried out over extended period of time: مونږ ډرامې ليدلی شوې [We were able to watch TV-shows]

Formed by:

Imperfective optative + present perfective of کېدل

Example:

 Past potential 2 
To indicate:

 Where the event was actually carried out e.g. تۀ هلته په وخت ورسېدلی شوې؟ [You were able to get there on time]

Formed by:

Perfective optative + past perfective of کېدل

 Auxiliary: "to be" 
The verb "to be" is irregular in Pashto and does not have an infinitive form.

Present imperfective
Present imperfective tense of "to be":

Present perfective form
Present perfective tense of "to be":

Past  form
Past  tense of "to be":

Future tense
In Pashto the future tense [ راتلونکی مهال] is the same as the present tense [اوسنی مهال] with the exception that in the future tense the marker به [bə] is added.

In the third person future tense, also, irrespective of number or gender وي is used.

Future tense of "to be":

 Imperative Form 
Also known as Command Form

 "Wi" – usage 
وي [wi] is also used; this is the third person singular and plural of the present tense of the verb to be. وي is used when an assumption or a given fact is being discussed where as دی/ده/دي are used reporting an observation. شته functions as "there is" in English.

 Verbs: causative construction 
This is used to make verbs that mean "to make (someone/something) do X" [where do X is the original verb].

Formation: verb stem + an affix و  /‑aw‑/.

The causative can either use the present stem or past stem [and sometimes both] – depending on the original verb.

Example:

 Verbs: imperative form 
This is used to make commands. The present stems of the verbs are used to make commands:

 Number 
The two verbal suffixes are employed:

Example:

The singular is told to one person; the plural is told to more than one person or as form of respectful command.

 Positive command 
Pashto positive imperative have two aspects: perfective (initial stress) an imperfective (final stress)

In general the perfective aspect is used to make commands. However, for doubly irregular verbs, the imperfective aspect is used.

 Intensive 
The imperfective aspect in the imperative is also used to convey a sense of an urgent command example:

 Compound verbs 

 Transitive 
For compounds in the transitive, the nominal/adjective part of the verb agrees with the direct object.

Where the is no object, the nominal/adjective part of the verb agrees with the subject

 Intransitive 
For compounds in the intransitive, the nominal/adjective part of the verb agrees with the subject

 Negative command 
Pashto Negative Imperatives only employs the Imperfective Aspect with stress on the particle مه /má/.

Compare:

 Prefixed verbs 
North Eastern Pashto treats negative forms differently for prefixed verbs, placing the negative particle before the entire verb, whereas some other dialects place it between the prefix and the stem.

Verbs: phrasal verbs
These by adding noun to verbs to make verbs phrase-like meaning.

 Verbalisers: Kawə́l and Kedə́l 
These two verbs, کول and کېدل, are  used to form compound verbs (denominal verbs). They use the irregular form in the perfective: without  prefix و  /wə́/.

 Kawə́l 
Here are the forms of Kawə́l as a verbaliser [not a main verb]:

As mentioned by Anna Boyle :  ړ /ṛ/ in present perfective forms is  written, and  pronounced in careful speech, but is unpronounced in many dialect. She mentions that in past 3rd person, even the /ṛ/ can be dropped, since the

personal suffixes differ from those in the present: past  ه /ə, a/ as opposed present ي /i/; thus revealing tense without need of  ړ  /ṛ/.

 Kedə́l 
Here are the forms of Kedə́l as a verbaliser [not a main verb]:

As mentioned by Anna Boyle the 1st and 2nd person forms of Kedə́l are the same  to those of the present perfective forms of "to be".

 Future Tense 
The future tense is formed with the addition of به /bә/; which has been defined by Tegey as a "future marker" and as a "modal clitic" by Boyle.

 Future Expression 
The clitic  به /bә/ is added to the present perfective verb to convey future time event, speculation, or doubt.

 With Present Imperfective Tense 
The clitic  به /bә/ is added to the present imperfective  verb to convey future event – but with. different nuances explained below.

 To describe a  future reference that is repeated or ongoing:

 Present Imperfective verb base is also used where future marker like "tomorrow", "next week" etc. is used:

 To contrast a future action with another future action:

 Negative Future Expressions 
With Present Perfect Base, negative future expressions can be created with the negative marker نه /nә/ and future marker  به /bә/.

 First Conjugattion Class 

 Simple Verbs 
If there is a grammatical subject or object:

Subject/Object +  به /bә/ + و /wә́/ + نه /nә/ + present verb stem + verbal suffix

If there is both a grammatical subject and object:

Subject +  به /bә/ + object+ و /wә́/ + نه /nә/ + present verb stem + verbal suffix

If there is no grammatical subject nor grammatical object:

و /wә́/ +  به /bә/ + نه /nә/ + present verb stem + verbal suffix

 a-initial verbs 
The و /wә́/ changes to وا /wā́/. Thereby:

If there is a grammatical subject or object:

Subject/Object +  به /bә/ +  وا /wā́/ + نه /nә/ + present verb stem + verbal suffixVerb: اخستل [axstә́l]If there is both a grammatical subject and object:

Subject +  به /bә/ + object+ وا /wā́/ + نه /nә/ + present verb stem + verbal suffixVerb: استول [astawә́l]If there is no grammatical subject nor grammatical object:

وا /wā́/ +  به /bә/ + نه /nә/ + present verb stem + verbal suffixVerb: اچول [ačawә́l] Second Conjugation Class 
First: Between the prefix and the verb base  نه /nә́/  is placed 

Second:  به /bә/  can then be placed

Before verb:

Or before the object (likely where there is a subject)

 Third Conjugation Class 
With compound verbs: نه /nә/  is inserted between the verb element and the noun/adjective element.

Example: روغېدل [roğedә́l]

 "Bә" With Past Imperfective Tense 
The marker به /bә/ is also used to convey habitual actions in the past.

 Adverbs 
Adverbs that modify adjectives, verbs or verb phrases, and sentences; can be divided into the classes of time, place, manner, and degree.

These adverbs can act alone or as part of an adpositional phrase.Acting alone:Acting as adipositional phrase: Adverbs of time 
These include adverbs with time reference and quantifier-like items.

Common adverbs of time:

 Adverbs of place 
This informs us where something takes place.

Common adverbs of time:

 Demonstrative pronouns 
These are both adverbs and demonstrative pronouns

Example sentence in Waziri:

Adpositions
Pashto has pre-positions, post-positions and pre-post-positions. Adpositions generally govern either oblique or ablative case assignment to their objects.

Prepositions
List of prepositions

Postpositions

Ambipositions
Pashto uses a significant amount of ambipositions (circumpositions). These usually have two elements, with the noun object positioned between the two elements.

The initial element is likely to be one of these four elements:

The final element is likely to be one of these words:

Here is a list of the simple formations:

Examples 

The first element must be dropped when the object of the pre-position is a weak pronoun. Examples:

Sometimes in colloquial Pashto, the word له is dropped from نه and سره. 

Phrases
Pashto consist of combinations of circumposition phrases and additional words.

 With له.... نه 
These use ambiposition له.... نه + additional word

In some dialects له is replaced by د

Examples

 With د ... په 
Examples:

Examples:

Note: the possessive phrase [də/د] can be substituted with a weak possessive pronoun.

 Adpositions and noun cases 

 Oblique case 
Most common case. The object [noun] of an adposition is most often assigned the oblique case.

Used with:

 ته /tə/ 'to' 
 سره /səra/ '[comitative] with'
 the prepositions د /də/ 'of' and په /pə/ 'at', plus any circumposition consisting of a postposition and one of these two prepositions; 
 the circumposition له ... نه /lə ... na/ 'from/.

Example: سړی [using preposition د] and ښځه [using preposition په] are in oblique case; compare ملګری in direct case

Example: ما -oblique pronoun used with circumposition په...کښې

 Ablative case 
Used with:

 له /lə/ 'from'; and also د /də/ having the same meaning 'from'
 تر /tər/ 'from, originating from'
 Circumposition containing تر /tər/, له /lə/; except له ... نه /lə ... na/ 'from/
په /pə/ the instrumental usage only found in construction with an adjectival, rather than nominal, object

Example: circumposition تر ... پورې

With د /də/, having the object marked in the ablative case gives the sense of '(motion) away from':

په /pə/ 'the instrumental usage + adjective:

 Mixed ablative case and oblique cases 
Other adpositions can assign either oblique or ablative case to the object, without a difference in meaning.

Example: with سړی in oblique case

Example: with سړی in ablative case

 Passive voice 
Pashto does not have a distinguishable morphological passive construction. The construction identified by some comprises a special case of denominal verbs. The verbal part of the construction consists of a form of the verbaliser کېدل /kedә́l ('to become') and a verbal complement (in the infinitive form).The actor is expressed as the subject of the sentence, and that noun is case-marked direct and triggers verb agreement (in both past and present).

The auxiliary verb کېدل combined with the infinitive وهل:

If the actor, if expressed, will most likely appear in an adpositional phrase governed by the circumposition د ...له خوا /də...lə xwā/ or د...له لورې /də...lə lure/.

As with active sentences, the subject may be expressed through the verb agreement suffix alone

This construction may modify a noun; like most noun modifiers, it precedes the head.

 Adverbial Clauses 
Pashto utilises conjunction phrases as adverbs. 
Examples:

 Particles 
Anna Boyle Davids defines particles "any lexically free item that does not host inflection and that does not function as the argument or complement of a verb or adposition".

 Existential 
The word شته [shta] and  its  negative form  نشته /nə́ šta/ is used to denote existence.

 Modal Particles 
Anna Boyle Davids defines these as: "...uninflected sentence-level modifiers. The clause within the scope of the particle may appear as a main clause or as a finite subordinate clause". چې   can appear as a main clause and as a finite subordinate clause.

 Affirmative 

 که نه 
Affirmation questions and statements contain the affirmation particle: که نه /kə ná/ (literally: "if/or no").

Affirmative Question Example:

Affirmative Statement Example:

 Deontic 

 دې 
The modal دې [de; Southern dialects: di] expresses a duty or obligation like "must " when used with the perfective tense of a verb.

 باید 
The modal "bāyád" is also found in construction with the present perfective form of the verb.  Tegey notes that like English "should" it carries ambiguity.

 پکار دى 
"Pəkā́r day" [it is needed] is also used as deontic clause

 Emphatic 

 خو 
The particle خو /xo/ appears in the second-position and denotes emphasis.

Note: as an  emphatic خو /xo/ is considered to be different from the conjunction خو /xo/ 'but'.

 Possibility 

 ښایي / ښائي 
The particle x̌ā́yi  is placed sentence-initially and can appear in construction with the complementizer چې [če]

The particle x̌ā́yi  can also demonstrate deonitic "should"

 کېدی شي 
Kedáy ši (could become) which potential construction of the verb "to become" – کېدل /kedә́l/ is also used as particle to denote possibility – again as above چې maybe used

 Vocative 
The following vocatives have been noted:

 Wish 

 کاشکې 
The particle  کاشکې /kāške/ or کاشکي /kāški/ is used  as English "if only"; to express wish or desire that something would happen or would have happened.

It can be used with an optative verb, to express a counterfactual wish.

It can also be used with the present perfective verb, to express a polite request.

Example, from Ghani Khan's poetry:

 Nuance 
In this section the nuances or the semantics in relation to specific words will be explained.

 راوړل and راوستل 
Both راوستل /rāwastә́l/  and راوړل /rāwṛә́l/ are both transitive verbs denoting the meaning of "to bring"; but their nuance is different. راوړل /rāwṛә́l/ has the meaning in which the subject is directly involved thus have the meaning more inline with  "to bring and carry".  راوستل /rāwastә́l/  has the meaning in which the subject is causing the object to be brought but the object by its own motion is come thus having a meaning closer to "to bring along".

 Tangible Objects 
Example راوړل:Explanation: Here the water is being brought by the speaker by his own hand or through a container e.g. by a glass

Example راوستل:Explanation: Here the water is being brought by the speaker as he/she has caused its bringing e.g. has made a canal/channel from the river bringing about the water

 Intangible Objects 
For intangible object  راوستل /rāwastә́l/ is better suited; as the object or concepts comes by its own motion.

But for bringing "news", "omens/luck" or "diseases"  راوړل /rāwṛә́l/  is used – perhaps as the subject is implied to carry it.

 Adjectives 
As noted by Ghaza Noor, the choice of an adjective suffix can also have a change on the meaning.

Example: اغېز – ağéz – effect [noun.masc.sing and plural]

 Slang 
Pashto also has rich slang language. Examples:

Syntax
Pashto has subject-object-verb (SOV) word order as opposed to English subject-verb-object (SVO) word order. In intransitive sentences where there is no object Pashto and English both have subject-verb (SV) word order.

In Pashto, however, all modifiers precede the verb whereas in English most of the verbal modifiers follow the verb.

Phrasal syntax
Pashto exhibits strong head-final order in noun phrases and verb phrases.

Noun phrases
Pashto noun phrases generally exhibit the internal order determiner – quantifier – adjective – noun.

Adpositional phrases
The salient exception to the head-final principle can be found in adpositional phrases, given the existence of prepositions, postpositions, and circumpositions.

Verb phrases
Generally, head-final order is found also in the verb phrase, with the verb, if any, as the final element. Relative clauses and sentence-level modifiers may appear in postclausal position.

Light verb constructions
Pashto has a robust system of light verb constructions (LVC), two-word expressions that are semantically interpretable as a single predicate. Only one of the two canonical types—those of the form noun/adjective + verb (N-V).

As verbs are a closed class in Pashto, the LVC is the only means of creating new verbal forms in the language; it is also used as a way of importing loanwords, with the borrowed word filling the complement slot.

The inventory of light verbs in Pashto should not surprise anyone familiar with LVCs. In addition to the verbs کېدل /kedəl/ 'to become' and کول /kawəl/ 'to make; to do', which we refer to as the intransitive and transitive verbalisers when they act as light verbs, Pashto uses the verbs اخیستل /axistəl/ 'to take', وهل /wahəl/ 'to beat', نيول /niwəl/ 'to seize; to grasp', and ایستل /istəl/ 'to throw out' as light verbs.

Adjective complements of N-V LVCs always show agreement with the undergoer of the action of the verb, which is in turn marked in accordance with Pashto's system of split ergativity. Nominal complements are usually treated as the direct object of the verb, and are therefore also case-marked according to split-ergative alignment. The undergoer of the action, on the other hand, cannot be a direct object, as the verb can have at most two arguments; it is instead indicated by an adposition and accordingly case-marked oblique.

Elements in the verbal group
The verbal group in general Pashto
Certain particles can be inserted between:
 The perfective prefix و /wə/́and its verb.
 A prefix or pseudo-prefix and its verb. (This includes both the a-initial complex verbs and second conjugation, or prefixed, verbs.)
 The complement of a denominal verb and its verbalizer.
The particles that interact with verbs in this way are:
 The modal clitics به /bə/ and دې /de/
 The weak personal pronouns, or pronominal clitics مې /me/, دې /de/, یې /ye/, and مو /mo/
The adverbial clitics خو /xo/ and نو /no/
 The negatives نه /ná/ and مه /má/
Modals, weak personal pronouns, and adverbials are all second-position clitics. They also obey strict rules of ordering relative to each other. Tegey (1977) reports the following ordering of enclitics between verbal components: خو /xo/> به /bə/> { مو /mo/| مې /me/| دې /de/| یې /ye/} > نو /no/. If the first syllable of the verb does not carry stress (that is, if it is an imperfective form), the negative precedes the verb, and the clitics follow the negative. Also, if a perfective form is negated, the negative marker—not the initial syllable of the verb—takes the stress.

Negative placement in the perfective verb phrase
The negative particle نه /ná/ nearly always precedes the verb and is placed as close to the verb stem as possible. In perfective constructions, it therefore follows the perfective marker و /wə/ for simplex verbs, and either initial /a/, the prefix, or the light verb complement for complex verbs. Because it carries an inherent stress, it takes the main stress in a perfective verb phrase.

 Numbers 

 Cardinal numbers 
Direct case, masculine

 Ordinal numbers 
Direct case, masc., sing.

 1st لومړی lumṛai [also ړومبی]
 2nd دويم dwaim [also دوهم]
 3rd درېيم drəyam
 4th څلورم tsaloram
 5th پنځم pindzam
 6th شپږم špaẓ̌am
 7th اووم uwam
 8th اتم atam
 9th نهم nəham
 10th لسم lasam

Notes 
1. په بارې کښې [pə bâre ke] is also used but this is a word-for-word borrowing from Hindi/Urdu के बारे में/کے بارے میں [kē bārē mēⁿ]. The Hindi word bārē [बारे/بارے] is itself from Persian در بارهٔ [dar bāraye\dar bāreye]
2. Pashto has a rich number of dialects due to which the language has been spelled several ways in English: Pashto, Pakhto, Pukhto.

References

External links
Anne Boyle David, "Descriptive Grammar of Pashto and its Dialects"
Habibullah Tegey & Barbara Robson  (1996) Center for Applied Linguistics
Herbert Penzl, A Grammar of Pashto: A Descriptive Study of the Dialect of Kandahar, AfghanistanGeorg Morgenstierne, "'AFGHANISTAN vi. Paṧtō'", Encyclopaedia Iranica
Longnow, Rosettaproject, Pashto, Southern Grammar
Mohammad Abid Khan & Fatima-Tuz-Zuhra, "Towards the Computational treatment of the Pashto Verb" 18(1) Scientific Khyber pp. 123–141 (2005)
 Noor Ullah, "Pashto Grammar" (2011), 
 M. Zyar, "ليک لارښود'' – Writing Guide" (2006)

Pashto
Iranian grammars